China Southern Airlines Company Limited, also known as China Southern, is an airline headquartered in Baiyun District, Guangzhou, Guangdong Province and is the largest airline in China. Established on 1 July 1988 following the restructuring of the CAAC Airlines that acquired and merged a number of domestic airlines, the airline became one of China's "Big Three" airlines (alongside Air China and China Eastern Airlines), the world's sixth-largest airline measured by passengers carried and Asia's largest airline in fleet size, revenue, and passengers carried. With its main hubs at Guangzhou Baiyun International Airport and Beijing Daxing International Airport, the airline operates more than 2,000 flights to more than 200 destinations daily and was a member of SkyTeam until 1 January 2019. The airline started a frequent flyer program partnership with American Airlines in March 2019. The logo of the airline consists of a kapok flower (which is also the city flower of Guangzhou) on a blue tail fin. The company slogan is Fly towards your dreams.

The parent company of China Southern Airlines Company Limited is China Southern Air Holding Company, a state-owned enterprise that is supervised by the State-owned Assets Supervision and Administration Commission of the State Council.

History and development

Founding

In 1984, the Chinese government disclosed the decision to decentralise the CAAC. Formed in 1949, CAAC was an all-encompassing organisation responsible for civil aviation in China as it was tasked with passenger transport, resource development and survey work, air traffic control, aircraft maintenance and personnel training. The decentralisation decision would result in numerous regional airlines, with four main carriers to be responsible for the majority of international and domestic air traffic: Air China, China Southern Airlines, China Eastern Airlines and China Southwest Airlines; CAAC itself would be rationalised into a regulatory and administrative organisation.

In 1988, CAAC granted its seven regional divisions, among which was the Guangzhou Regional Administration, limited operating autonomy with the status of "associate" airlines. China Southern Airlines began flying under its own name and livery in February 1991. At this time, the aircraft operated some 160 flights a day on 100 routes using the Antonov An-24, Boeing 737 and Boeing 757, along with helicopters and agricultural aircraft. In December 1992, the airline placed a US$800-million order for six Boeing 777s and the associated spare parts and training.

The airline completed its decentralisation from CAAC when it gained independence on 10 October 1993. As such, the airline could from then on restructure itself into shareholding enterprises, independently arrange external financing and establish subsidiaries to complement its core enterprise. During the airline's early years, the carrier was the dominant domestic carrier. Together with the two major airlines of China – Air China and China Eastern – the airline handled half of passenger traffic carried by all Chinese carriers. Owing to Air China's status as the country's flag carrier, the airline is entitled to extensive international service rights, with China Eastern and China Southern's international networks confined to mainly East Asia and within Asia, respectively. Like other Chinese carriers, China Southern was subjected to CAAC's exclusive right to grant operating rights for every prospective route as well as to regulate domestic prices.

Expansion

Starting in the mid-1990s, China Southern sought to expand its international reach beyond Asia. In December 1995, the Chinese and US governments signed an aviation agreement that would allow the commencement of non-stop air services between the two countries. After having been granted the right to establish services to Amsterdam in early 1996, the airline started Guangzhou–Beijing–Amsterdam, its first long-haul route, in November 1996. The following year, the carrier commenced non-stop trans-Pacific services to Los Angeles, as well as services to Brisbane.

The start of European and American services coincided with the arrival of the long-range Boeing 777s, the first of which was delivered in late December 1995, as well as a general expansion and upgrade of the carrier's fleet and the associated facilities. Due to engine certification and labor relations issues, the delivery of the first Boeing 777 was more than a month behind schedule. As a result, the carrier considered, but ultimately decided against, leasing the Boeing 747-400, which would have been used to cover anticipated delays as well as to launch trans-Pacific services to the US. Nevertheless, the airline planned to double its fleet of 67 aircraft. In April 1996, the Chinese government would place an order, on China Southern's behalf, for 10 Airbus A320s; the delivery of the first aircraft, and China Southern's first Airbus, was made the following year. Guangzhou Aircraft Maintenance Engineering Company, which was jointly established with Lockheed Aircraft Services International and Hutchinson Whampoa, was carrying out expansion of its aircraft maintenance facilities in anticipation of the increase.

To keep pace with fast developments, China Southern raised capital, becoming listed on the Hong Kong and New York Stock Exchanges in July 1997, and raising $600–$700 million. Much of the funds raised were used to facilitate the airline's fleet expansion, repayment of debt, and investments in other capital; it followed up with domestic listing in 2003 at the Shanghai Stock Exchange. By 1997, the airline, along with its joint-venture airlines Xiamen Airlines, Shantou Airlinesm and Guangxi Airlines, was carrying some 15 million passengers per year using about 90 aircraft, operating about 270 routes among 68 destinations and almost 2,450 flights per week. The airline group's revenue totalled some US$1.4 billion with a net income of $90 million.

Mergers and acquisitions
The end of the 1990s was a period of consolidation for the Chinese airline industry. Initially, China Southern looked to acquire several smaller non-profitable domestic carriers as it sought to highlight its expansion plans in an effort to raise funds; among the deals was the purchase of 60% shares of Guizhou Airlines. Due to the weakening economy amidst the 1997 Asian financial crisis and intense competition among the some 30 Chinese carriers, in 1998, CAAC considered a comprehensive restructuring of the industry that would see the consolidation of the airlines into three or five carrier groups. At one stage, it was reported that CAAC was contemplating a forced merger of Air China and China Southern. Given the latter's dual listing in Hong Kong and New York, it was thought that such a merger would have eased Air China's path towards its own share offering. China Southern confirmed that such talks between them were occurring, although they ultimately proved fruitless. Had the merger proceeded, their combined fleets would have numbered some 250 aircraft, which would have made the resultant airline the largest in Asia.

Although there was considerable resistance to CAAC's call to rationalise the industry, in July 2000, the administrative body announced that the ten airlines under its direct management will be merged into three airline groups, revolving around Air China, China Eastern Airlines and China Southern itself. Within a month, China Southern had started absorbing Zhengzhou-based Zhongyuan Airlines, which at the time operated five Boeing 737s and two Xian Y-7 turboprops. The carrier would later merge with Shenyang-based China Northern Airlines and Urumqi-based Xinjiang Airlines to form China Southern Air Holding Co., a process that took more than two years and would culminate in China Southern's acquisition of their US$2 billion's worth of assets (as well as $1.8 billion of debt) in November 2004. Consequently, China Southern's fleet expanded from some 140 aircraft to over 210. The takeovers meant that the carrier became the main airline at Shenyang and Ürümqi, with passenger numbers' jumping from 28.2 million in 2004 to 44.1 million in 2005. As a result, China Southern Airlines became one of the "Big Three" carriers in the country. Since then, it has successively taken over shareholding stocks and joined the equity in numerous Chinese carriers. The airline is the major shareholder of Xiamen Airlines (55%) and Chongqing Airlines (60%); it also invests in Sichuan Airlines (39%).

Amidst the major consolidation of the airline industry, China Southern in April 2000 started dedicated cargo services from Shenzhen using a Boeing 747-200F (which was quickly upgraded to the Boeing 747-400F) wet-leased from Atlas Air. To capitalise on the economic growth of the Pearl River Delta region (which includes Hong Kong), the carrier constructed a dedicated cargo centre in Shenzhen. Successful operations prompted an order for two Boeing 747-400Fs the following year. The airline by now had commenced operations to Sydney and Melbourne.

In September 2003, China Southern signed a purchase agreement for four Airbus A330-200s, to be delivered from 2005. This was part of the order placed in April by the China Aviation Supplies Imp. & Exp. Group covering 30 aircraft. China Southern became the first mainland Chinese A330 operator with the delivery of the first example February 2005. China Southern followed up in September 2005 with a further order for eight A330-300s and two A330-200s.

The month of January 2005 proved to be significant for civil aviation in China in general and China Southern in particular. In preparation for the 2008 Summer Olympics in Beijing, China Southern and the Chinese government placed several landmark widebody-aircraft orders from Airbus and Boeing. More specifically, on 28 January 2005, the carrier became the first (and so far the only) Chinese carrier to commit to the Airbus A380 double-deck aircraft, when it signed a general-terms agreement for five examples worth US$1.4 billion at catalogue prices. On the same day, China Southern, along with five other domestic carriers, placed a bulk order for 60 Boeing 7E7s (later renamed the Boeing 787 Dreamliner). The aircraft were worth $7.2 billion at list prices, and the first example was expected to be delivered in time for the Olympics; however, the first aircraft did not arrive until June 2013.

Earlier during the month, the CAAC had approved the temporary operations of charter flights between mainland China and Taiwan. On the same day as the widebody orders, a China Southern Airlines Boeing 777-200 took off from Guangzhou and landed in Taipei the following day, becoming the first mainland Chinese aircraft to land in the Republic of China since 1949, when the Kuomintang were involved in Chinese Civil War with the Chinese Communist Party. The flight carried 242 passengers home after the Lunar New Year. Previously, passengers travelling between the mainland and Taiwan had to transit through a third port such as Hong Kong or Macau. Within three years, in July 2008, a China Southern Airlines Airbus A330 carrying 230 tourists again landed in Taipei. The governments of China and Taiwan had both agreed to allow direct flights across the Taiwan Strait in June, ending six decades of limited air travel between the two sides. Following the flight, China Southern Airlines Chairman and pilot of the flight, Liu Shaoyong, said, "From today onward, regular commercial flights will replace the rumbling warplanes over the skies of the Taiwan Strait, and relations between the two sides will become better and better."

Following two years of negotiations which had started in August 2004, China Southern in late June 2006 signed an agreement with SkyTeam, one of the three global airline alliances, formally pledging itself to the improvement of standards with the aim of its eventual joining. According to the agreement, the airline committed to the upgrade of handling services, facilities and training of at least 75% of its staff to SkyTeam's standards. On 15 November 2007, China Southern officially joined SkyTeam, becoming the eleventh carrier to join the grouping and the first mainland Chinese carrier to join an airline alliance. The welcoming ceremony was attended by high-ranking Chinese government and SkyTeam corporate officials and was held at the Great Hall of the People. The carrier's integration with the alliance continued with its entry into SkyTeam Cargo in November 2010, and its joint-venture carrier Xiamen Airlines' formal joining in November 2012. With China Eastern's ascension in June 2011, SkyTeam furthered its leading presence on the mainland Chinese market; the remaining Big Three carrier, Air China, is a member of Star Alliance.

It followed up with another Airbus order on 7 July 2006, when it confirmed a deal covering the purchase of 50 more A320 narrow bodies for delivery from 2009. The order included 13 A319-100s, 20 A320-200s and 17 A321-200s, reportedly worth $3.3 billion at list price. In December 2005, China Southern Airlines along with CASGC, announced an order with Boeing for 9 Boeing 737-700s and 11 Boeing 737-800s.

In June 2006, China Southern Airlines confirmed another order of 3 Boeing 737-700s and 7 Boeing 737-800s. The deliveries would continue through 2010. On 18 October 2006, China Southern Airlines placed an order for 6 Boeing 777 freighters, striding forward a brand new step in its cargo development. The aircraft would be delivered from November 2008 to July 2010.

On 20 August 2007, China Southern Airlines announced its intention for an order of 25 Boeing 737-700s and 30 Boeing 737-800s, which will be delivered from May 2011 to October 2013. It was a mere two months before, on 23 October 2007, China Southern Airlines announced that it had placed an order for 10 additional Airbus A330-200s. The order has a listed price of US$1.677 billion and the aircraft will be delivered from March 2010 to August 2012.

Recent developments
During 2009, China Southern Airlines remodeled its strategy from a point to point hub to a full hub and spoke carrier, which has been proven successful. Along with that, the airline has rapidly expanded its international market share, particularly in Australia, where passenger numbers in 2011 have been 97% greater than in 2010.

On 21 January 2010, China Southern Airlines announced an order for an additional 20 A320-200s, scheduled for delivery from 2011, due to the falling fuel costs and surging passenger demand. In March 2010, the Chinese carrier issued new shares in Hong Kong and Shanghai 2010 to raise 10.75 billion yuan ($1.57 billion) in a bid to pay off outstanding loans. In December, CNY810 million ($121.5 million) was injected by China Southern Airlines into its subsidiary Xiamen Airlines to fund its fleet expansion. In November 2010, China Southern Airlines signed an agreement with Airbus for the purchase of six A330s and 30 A320s–200.

On 11 January 2011, China Southern Airlines announced a lease for 10 Embraer E-190, set to be delivered from the second half of 2011. On 27 January 2011, China Southern Airlines was awarded a four-star ranking by Skytrax. It is the largest airline to hold this title. On 17 October 2011, China Southern Airlines made its first flight with the Airbus A380. Initially, the airline deployed the A380s on domestic routes, flying between Guangzhou, Beijing, Shanghai and Hong Kong. At the same time, the carrier conducted negotiations to commence A380 international services. Due to the government-imposed limitation which confined an international route to a single airline, China Southern in August 2012 announced its intention to initiate Beijing-Paris services in cooperation with Air China, pending government approval. Two months later, the A380 was deployed on Guangzhou-Los Angeles services. Early A380 operations were unprofitable and the aircraft, underutilised; services to Sydney were thus launched in October 2013. By now talks with Air China on Beijing-Paris services had ceased.

While China Southern, like the other Big Three Chinese carriers, had been expanding rapidly since 2000, much of their activities had been focused on the domestic market. With the increase in outflow of Chinese tourists, who in 2012 for example spent $102 billion internationally, as well as the rapid construction and introduction of high-speed rail in China, the carrier shifted its outlook overseas in order to sustain growth. Owing to the location of its hub at Guangzhou, which hinders the airline effectively serving the North American market, the airline concentrated its international expansion on Australasia. In June 2012, with the inauguration of services from Guangzhou to London-Heathrow, the airline started marketing its services connecting Europe and Australia as the "Canton Route", an alternative to the Kangaroo Route flown by carriers such as Qantas. It hoped to attract the predominantly business traffic that travel between Europe and Australia, and channel such sixth-freedom traffic as well as traffic from mainland China through its Guangzhou hub (thereby transforming the carrier's network from one that emphasises point-to-point to a hub-and-spoke system). The carrier by now had added cities such as Auckland, Istanbul, Perth, and Vancouver to its route map.

During May–June 2012, China Southern Airlines has recruited Dutch flight attendants to serve the First and Business class sections for flights from Guangzhou to Amsterdam.

On 7 June 2013, China Southern Airlines began operating its first Boeing 787.

In early 2015 it was announced that the airline would lease 24 Airbus A320neo aircraft from AerCap for delivery between 2016 and 2019.

On 15 November 2018, the airline announced that it would leave SkyTeam by 1 January 2019 and will strengthen its partnership with American Airlines and others. The announcement lead to speculation that it will join Oneworld alongside Hong Kong carrier Cathay Pacific. Various media outlets reported that while analysts predict that its Oneworld move could threaten Cathay Pacific's position in the alliance, other analysts states that China Southern joining Oneworld would benefit Cathay more due to different target markets.

In March 2019, the airline announced a frequent flyer partnership with American Airlines. Currently, the airline plans for more flexible tie-ups with other carriers, mostly with Oneworld members such as Qatar Airways while not joining the alliance 'for a few years' in order to fulfill its dream as 'world's largest airline'. On September 26, 2019, China Southern operates at Beijing Daxing International Airport alongside its former and current partners, and all of its flights to and from Beijing are transferred to Daxing on 25 October 2020.

In November 2022, China Southern scheduled their last Airbus A380 flights prior to their planned retirement.

Corporate affairs

China Southern is headquartered in the China Southern Air Building at 68 Qixin Road in Baiyun District, Guangzhou, Guangdong Province.

It was previously at 278 Jichang (Airport) Road in Baiyun District.

Woods Bagot won a competition for the architect firm which would design the facility. The proposed site consists of two parcels of land on opposite sides of a highway leading to Baiyun Airport; both sites are shaped like wings. The site will have a bridge and light rail system that operates above the highway to connect the two parcels, which will each have distinct functions. For instance, the east parcel will house internal functions such as the data center facilities, staff dormitories, and the training center. The airline wants it to be aesthetically pleasing from the air since it sits below a runway approach. The site will have a lot of outdoor space, which Woods Bagot designed along with Hargreaves Associates and Sherwood Design Engineers. Jean Weng, a Woods Bagot Beijing-based principal, said "Most Chinese cities are very dense and very urban, but China Southern wants to create a human-scale campus, that's close to nature." The new headquarters was opened in August 2016.

Destinations

Map

Overview

China Southern Airlines serves 193 destinations in 35 countries worldwide. It maintains a strong presence in the domestic market with its main hubs at Beijing Daxing International Airport and Guangzhou Baiyun International Airport with secondary hubs at Shanghai Pudong International Airport, Chongqing Jiangbei International Airport, and Ürümqi Diwopu International Airport, along with other focus cities in Changchun, Changsha, Dalian, Shenyang, Shenzhen, Wuhan, and Zhengzhou. The airline plans to continue to develop Chongqing and Ürümqi as hubs as well to exploit the domestic market potential.

China Southern offers 485 flights a day from its Guangzhou hub and 221 from its Beijing hub. The airline provides services to 65 international destinations. Most of the international flights link Guangzhou with world cities. There are also plenty of international flights operated through Beijing, Shanghai, Ürümqi (notably to Central Asia and Middle-east) and Dalian (to Japan, South Korea, and Russia). China Southern Airlines has developed an extensive network to Southeast Asia and also has become the Chinese airline with the largest presence in Australia. China Southern is also considering expanding into the South American markets, as well as further expansion into the African market.

Alliance
On 28 August 2004, China Southern Airlines signed a Memorandum of Understanding with the airline alliance SkyTeam. On 15 November 2007, the airline was officially welcomed as the 11th member of SkyTeam, becoming the first mainland Chinese airline to join any global airline alliance, expanding the alliance's presence on mainland China.

On 24 December 2018, China Southern Airlines released an official statement saying that it would discontinue its SkyTeam membership on 1 January 2019 and will also terminate its partnership with China Eastern and Delta.

Codeshare agreements
China Southern Airlines codeshares with the following airlines:

 Aeroflot
 Aerolíneas Argentinas
 Air Canada (selected routes only)
 Air France (Joint Venture Partner)
 American Airlines
 Asiana Airlines
 British Airways
 China Airlines
 China Express Airlines
 Czech Airlines
 Emirates
 Etihad Airways
 Finnair
 Iberia
 Garuda Indonesia
 Japan Airlines
 Kenya Airways
 KLM (Joint Venture Partner)
 Korean Air
 LATAM Airlines Group
 Lufthansa
 Mandarin Airlines
 Pakistan International Airlines
 Qantas
 Qatar Airways
 Saudia
 Sichuan Airlines
 Vietnam Airlines
 WestJet
 XiamenAir

Fleet

Current fleet 

, China Southern Airlines operates the following aircraft:

Cargo

China Southern Cargo is the cargo subsidiary of China Southern Airlines. The cargo airline provides services between mainland China and North America, Europe, and Australia, where destinations such as Amsterdam, Anchorage, Chicago, Frankfurt, Los Angeles, Vancouver, Vienna, and London Stansted are served from its main hub at Shanghai Pudong International Airport, with cargo flights to Amsterdam and Milan from Guangzhou Baiyun International Airport. The cargo subsidiary joined the SkyTeam Cargo alliance in November 2010 and withdrew on 1 January 2019 following the airline's withdrawal from SkyTeam.

Former fleet

China Southern Airlines previously operated the following aircraft

Airbus A380

China Southern Airlines was the only Chinese airline to have operated the Airbus A380. The airline initially operated these aircraft on Beijing–Hong Kong and Beijing–Guangzhou routes. However, these services struggled to be profitable. Due to the demand limitation of the airline's international hub at Guangzhou Baiyun Airport, few routes from Guangzhou have the demand to support an A380. In efforts to make its A380s viable, China Southern started operating A380 on its Guangzhou–Los Angeles route and on the Guangzhou–Sydney route. Additionally, China Southern flew A380s to Sydney and Melbourne every summer during its peak travel period. As of 20 June 2015, China Southern began operating the Airbus A380 from Beijing to Amsterdam. The A380 also operates four domestic flights each day between Beijing and Guangzhou. The airline's A380s are retired by November 2022.

Special liveries gallery

Services

China Southern Airlines offers First Class, Business Class, Premium Economy and Economy Class.

First Class

China Southern Airlines offers an "Experience Luxurious Skybed" on Boeing 787-8s. It is equipped with personal privacy, in-built massage, a 17-inch personal TV and fully reclining seat.

China Southern Airlines offers Premium First Class on select flights, such as on the Beijing-Guangzhou route. This cabin offers more amenities and is more spacious than Regular First Class, such as a variety of lighting options and a private storage cabinet with a password lock.

Business Class
Business Class also offers a fully flat bed, and an adjustable privacy divider. It includes a USB port and a reading light. It also has a 15-inch TV.

Economy Class

Economy Class features a seat and a 9-inch personal TV. It also has a multi-adjustable headrest.

China Southern also offers Premium Economy class, which is more spacious than Economy class. The Boeing 777-300ERs however, are equipped with fixed-shell premium economy seats similar to those seen on Air France's Boeing 777s.

Sky Pearl Club
China Southern Airlines's frequent-flyer program is called Sky Pearl Club. The Sky Pearl Club allows its members earn FFP mileage not only flying China Southern domestic segments but also on flights of other codeshare member airlines. Additionally, Sky Pearl Club members can earn and use mileage on partnered Sichuan Airlines, China Eastern Airlines, and China Airlines flights. Membership of Sky Pearl Club is divided into three tiers: Sky Pearl Gold Card, Sky Pearl Silver Card and Sky Pearl Member Card.

Incidents and accidents
China Southern Airlines Flight 301: On 31 August 1988, a Hawker Siddeley Trident 2E (B-2218), struck approach lights at Kai Tak Airport and struck a lip, collapsing the right main landing gear; the aircraft then slid off the runway into Kowloon Bay, killing 7 of the 89 on board. The cause was undetermined, but windshear may have been a factor.
 Guangzhou Baiyun aircraft collision: On 2 October 1990, a hijacked Xiamen Airlines Boeing 737 crashed into a China Southern Airlines Boeing 757, killing 128 people from both aircraft.
 China Southern Airlines Flight 3943: On 24 November 1992, China Southern Airlines Flight 3943, a Boeing 737-300, crashed into a hill near Guilin, Guangxi, due to an engine thrust malfunction. All 141 people on board were killed.
 China Southern Airlines Flight 3456: On 8 May 1997, China Southern Flight 3456, a Boeing 737-300, crashed on approach to Shenzhen Bao'an International Airport killing 35 people and injuring 9.

Controversy

Shipping of primates to laboratories
In 2013, the United States Department of Agriculture (USDA) found the airline had transported more than 1,000 monkeys into the United States through the arrangements of Air Transport International, without federal permission to do so, and had transported the animals in insecure crates. The  USDA ordered China Southern Airlines to pay $11,600 in fines for violations of the Animal Welfare Act (AWA) during the airline's transport of monkeys to laboratories in the United States. Although the USDA cited Air Transport International for failure to provide food and water to the imported animals, China Southern Airlines was previously also ordered to pay $14,438 for AWA violations during one transport that left more than a dozen monkeys dead after they went without food and water for an extended period of time. Following these most recent violations, where the delivered animals were left neglected after arrival in the US, China Southern announced that it would no longer transport laboratory animals to the US. PETA had protested against the airline for these shipments.

See also

 Civil aviation in China
 List of airlines of China
 Transport in China

References

External links 

 —
 —
 

 
Airlines of China
Cargo airlines of China
Government-owned companies of China
South China
Former SkyTeam members
Companies based in Guangzhou
Airlines established in 1988
Chinese companies established in 1988
Chinese brands
Transport in Guangdong
Transport in Guangxi
Transport in Guangzhou
Transport in Hainan
Companies listed on the Hong Kong Stock Exchange
Companies listed on the New York Stock Exchange
Companies listed on the Shanghai Stock Exchange
H shares